

Precolonial Era 100- 1530AD 

See: Homosexuality in Ancient Peru

16th to 20th century

Homosexuality in Peru was decriminalised in 1837.

21st century

See: LGBT rights in Peru

References